The 1868 United States presidential election in New Jersey took place on November 3, 1868, as part of the 1868 United States presidential election. Voters chose seven representatives, or electors to the Electoral College, who voted for president and vice president.

New Jersey voted for the Democratic nominee, former Governor of New York Horatio Seymour, over the Republican nominee, General Ulysses S. Grant. Seymour won by a very narrow margin of 1.76%.

Results

See also
 United States presidential elections in New Jersey

References

New Jersey
1868
1868 New Jersey elections